Joseph Marie de Tilly (16 August 1837 – 4 August 1906) was a Belgian military man and mathematician.

He was born in Ypres, Belgium. In 1858, he became a teacher in mathematics at the regimental school. He began with studying geometry, particularly Euclid's fifth postulate and non-Euclidean geometry. He found similar results as Lobachevsky in 1860, but the Russian mathematician was already dead at that time.  Tilly is more known for his work on non-Euclidean mechanics, as he was the one who invented it.  He worked thus alone on this topic until a French mathematician, Jules Hoüel, showed interest in that field.  Tilly also wrote on military science and history of mathematics.  He died in München, Germany.

References
 

1837 births
1906 deaths
Belgian mathematicians
People from Ypres